Taj Ladies Volleyball Club was a volleyball club, established in Tehran. Taj volleyball club was owned by Taj sports and cultural organization.

History 
Established in early 1960s Taj was one of the powerhouses of Iranian volleyball. On September 1963 Iran women's national volleyball team was formed and played their first friendly match against Japan. Most of the players of Iran national team were members of Taj and Taj played a vital rule in forming Iranian national volleyball team.

Honours

National 

 Shahbanoo Cup

 Champions (1): 1975

Regional 

 Tehran Clubs Championship

 Champions (3): 1962, 1971, 1983
 Runners-up (1): 1973
 Third place (1): 1975

Gallery

See also 

 List of Esteghlal F.C. records and statistics
 List of Esteghlal F.C. honours

References

Bibliography 

 

Esteghlal F.C.
Iranian volleyball clubs
Volleyball in Iran